The Natural History Museum of Nice (French: Muséum d'histoire naturelle de Nice) is a French natural-history museum located in Nice.

Origins
The museum was founded in 1846 by Jean Baptiste Vérany (1800–1865), a French pharmacist and naturalist who specialized in the study of cephalopods, and Jean-Baptiste Barla (1817–1896), a French botanist.

Collections
It has extensive collections mainly from the Mediterranean region but also from Africa, the Indian Ocean and South America.

Location
The museum's address is 60 du boulevard Risso, just behind Place Garibaldi near the MAMAC ( Musée d'Art Moderne et d'Art Contemporain).

See also

List of museums in France
List of natural history museums

References

External links 
 mhnnice.org (in French), museum's official website

Museums established in 1846
Museums in Nice
Natural history museums in France
1846 establishments in the Kingdom of Sardinia